Ludwin Van Nieuwenhuyze (born 25 February 1978 in Waregem) is a Belgian professional football player. He is a defensive midfielder who currently plays for K.S.V. Oudenaarde.

Before turning professional, Van Nieuwenhuyze was active in the construction sector. When Van Nieuwenhuyze won the Belgian Cup with Zulte Waregem in 2005–06, he and several other teammates were still not professional footballers.

Honours
Zulte Waregem
Belgian Cup: 2005–06

References

External links
 Ludwin Van Nieuwenhuyze player info at the official SV Zulte Waregem website 

1978 births
Living people
Belgian footballers
Association football midfielders
S.V. Zulte Waregem players
Belgian Pro League players
People from Waregem
K.R.C. Zuid-West-Vlaanderen players
Footballers from West Flanders